Shawi may be,

Shawi language, Peru

Species
Panthera shawi
Meriones shawi
Baltia shawi